Baron La Poer, de la Poer, or Le Pour, is a title in the Peerage of Ireland held by the Marquess of Waterford. Its creation is the sole instance in the law of the Kingdom of Ireland recognising a peerage by writ.

Origin of the  title
James Power, 3rd Earl of Tyrone, who was also the 8th Baron Power, held both his titles by letters patent (dated 1535 and 1637 respectively), which specified that the titles would be inherited by heirs male of the grantee. When he died in 1704 however, his only child was a daughter, Lady Catharine Power. The Earldom became extinct, and in an ordinary course of events, the Barony of Power would have been inherited by his distant cousin, Colonel John Power (or Poore) of the French Régiment de Dublin. The colonel was however a Jacobite and therefore outlawed and attainted in 1688. Although inheriting none of the titles, Lady Catharine therefore inherited the land. 

Lady Catharine grew up and married in 1717 an Irish freemason and politician, Sir Marcus Beresford, 4th Baronet. After a lawsuit with John Power, Sir Marcus and Lady Catharine retained the Power property, and Sir Marcus was raised into the Peerage of Ireland by creating him Viscount Tyrone in 1720. After the Jacobite rebellion of 1745, he was further elevated in 1746 as Earl of Tyrone (the same name of title as that of his father-in-law, but a new creation). After he died in 1763, Lady Catharine, now the Dowager Countess of Tyrone, had petitioned the Irish House of Lords to restore to her the "Barony de la Poer", which she asserted was created by writ for her grandfather Richard Power. He was summoned to the Parliament of Ireland somewhere in the 1650s, but was not yet a peer. He became the 6th Baron Power in 1661, and was created the 1st Earl of Tyrone and 1st Viscount Decies in 1673.

Petition
The petition was based on another writ received by Nicholas (fitz John) le Poer, of Kilmeadan, who was summoned to the Parliament of Ireland on 23 November 1375, 22 January 1378, and 11 September 1380. The Dowager Countess of Tyrone was a descendant of Nicholas's daughter Ellen, who married David Poer or Power, known as "Davey Rothe", of Conoughmore, ancestor of the Barons Power. Since Nicholas le Poer also had sons who left children, the Countess was not heiress of Nicholas.   

Nevertheless, on 9 November 1767 the Irish House of Lords resolved that she had proved her case; the Crown confirmed this on 19 December 1767 and allowed her "all the rights and privileges belonging to the said Barony", as they had been held by "her grandfather Richard, who sat and voted as Baron La Poer". As Complete Peerage remarks, the effect of a resolution that "a lady was entitled to a barony that never existed" (and to which she would not be heiress if it had) is open to question; so is the confirmation in all the rights of a man who never held the barony.

Successors
When the Dowager Countess died, 27 July 1769, any title she may have held passed to her son George, 2nd Earl of Tyrone, who was promoted to Marquess of Waterford in 1789, as part of the British government's effort to manage Grattan's Parliament; all his titles are held today by Henry Beresford, 9th Marquess of Waterford.

"Barony by writ" vs. "barony by patent"

Instead of a barony by patent, a "barony by writ" is a hereditary title created by a writ of summons, but without issuing a letters patent. Other differences are that a barony by writ is inherited in strict order of succession by the heirs general of the recipient of the writ: daughters of barons, if they are only children (like Countess Catharine), do therefore inherit such baronies. A barony by writ is a typical creation of English common law, but aside from this case, they are now almost non-existent in the Peerage of Ireland.

Spelling
Both titles and the surnames le Poer, Power, Poore are all forms of the same name, originally Anglo-Norman le pover, "the Poor". It was quite common in medieval England and Ireland; the spellings de la Poer and La Poer, in the feminine, originate from the Countess's petition, although it is ungrammatical, and J. H. Round called it "idiotic"; the feminine article may be the result of applying it to a peeress.

Her spelling has been widely used as a middle name by her Beresford descendants; some of the Powers also adopted this fashionable spelling. Some romantics also claimed a connection with Poher in Brittany. 

One of these changes of name was made by Frances Power, daughter of Sir John Power, Baronet of Kilfane, who happened to marry another John Power (of Castle Gurteen de la Poer), the lineal heir of Colonel John Power above-mentioned; as a widow she changed her name legally to Frances de la Poer, in commemoration of a companion of Strongbow; her son styled himself Edmond James de Poher de la Poer; his son, John William Rivallon de la Poer, petitioned the Crown in 1920 to recognize him as Baron Power; the Committee of Privileges of the British House of Lords decided that he would be Baron le Power and Conoughmore, if it were not for his ancestor's outlawry, but they did not reverse it.

References

Further reading
 

Baronies created by error
Baron